.gal is a GeoTLD intended to highlight the Galician people, Galician language, and Galician culture.  It was approved on 14 June 2013 by ICANN, and the first 93 domains went online on July 25, 2014.

The initiative was backed by more than 13,700 people and 110 institutions in Galicia, including relevant agencies of culture such as the Royal Galician Academy, the Galician Culture Council, and the three Galician universities. Asociación PuntoGal is committed to establishing a foundation to reinvest the money in projects that promote Galician language and culture in the field of new technologies.

See also
 List of Internet top-level domains
 Top-level domain

References

External links
 Asociación PuntoGal
 Dominio .gal, the first domain, which became operational on May 16, 2014
 The news on Sermos Galiza

Generic top-level domains
Internet in Spain
Galician language